A Song for You is a studio album by American jazz vocalist Steve Tyrell. It was released in February 2018 under New Design Records, and features love songs originally sung by artists such as Van Morrison, Harold Arlen and Johnny Mercer.

Track listing

References

2018 compilation albums
Steve Tyrell albums